Elora Danan were an Australian alternative rock band from Perth, Western Australia, formed in late 2006 from various other bands in the local scene who had ended including As A Weapon and Alleged. They took their name from a baby character in the 1988 film Willow.

The band's first release was an extended play (EP) entitled We All Have Secrets in 2007. They then followed up with their debut studio album in 2009, In the Room Up There. The band split up later in 2009.

History

Early years (2006)

The band's first recordings were some early demos, simply titled "Demo 2006". The release featured two songs, "Stop It, Stop Breathing!", and "I Feel Like Saying More". The second song was featured on a Boomtown sampler, and the first song was later re-recorded.

We All Have Secrets (2007)

After recording the demo in late 2006 the band signed to Boomtown Records, releasing their first official record, the EP We All Have Secrets in mid-2007. The song "Stop It, Stop Breathing!" from the demo was reborn as "Thank God For Their Growth In Faith And Love" on the EP, with the only differences being a piano outro at the end of "Thank God...", making it almost two minutes longer than the original version. All other songs on the EP were based on films.

In the Room Up There (2008-2009)

In mid-2008 the band recorded their first and only studio album entitled In the Room Up There. The album was released 6 March 2009 and was produced by Adam Spark, guitarist/producer of Birds of Tokyo. Around the time of this recording the band became a six-piece with the addition of guitarist Tim Marley. The recording was finished in August 2008; however, there was an eight-month delay in its release.

Given the delays in the release of the album, Elora Danan have decided not to further the relationship with Boomtown Records. 

The band have played many shows with big bands in their short time of formation including local favorites and international bands including The Getaway Plan, In Fiction, Behind Crimson Eyes, Unwritten Law, Sprung Monkey, New Found Glory and Saosin.  The band also played on the local spot at the Soundwave festival in 2009, alongside Nine Inch Nails, Alice in Chains, Bloodhound Gang, The Subways and Underoath.

Breakup

On 29 May 2009, Elora Danan announced on their MySpace page that they would be disbanding. In an interview with FasterLouder, the band revealed their disapproval of their record label, Boomtown Records, giving a piece of advice to other bands after their experiences; saying "Don’t sign with Boomtown Records!". In an earlier interview when asked if Boomtown were treating them well, frontman George Green told the website, "Fuck no. Those guys have been making us fold all of The Getaway Plan's washing and doing their homework." The band also spoke of the economic problems they faced as a small band, "We owe a lot of money to a lot of people". They were even forced to sell clothing through MySpace to get by. The band explained the breakup by simply stating "these guys just don’t want to be in the band anymore" and "its better this way because everyone likes each other more now."

Members

Final line-up
 George Green - vocals
 Isaac Kara - vocals, guitar, piano
 Ryan Smith - guitar
 Tim Marley - guitar
 Matt Thomas - bass
 Jay Rendle O’Shea - drums

Former members
 Caleb Baker - drums

New bands after Elora Danan
 George Green now fronts a new band, Sleepwalker.
 Other former members of Elora Danan have moved on to play in several new groups including Robutthole, Arms Like Branches, Eunuch Schools and Into The Sea.

Discography

Studio albums
In the Room Up There (2009)

Extended plays
We All Have Secrets (2007)

Singles
 "Door, Up, Elevator" (2008)
 "The Greater Good" (2009)

Demos
Demo 2006

 "Stop It, Stop Breathing!"
 "I Feel Like Saying More"

References

External links 
 Official MySpace
 Boomtown Official Page
 Triple J Unearthed Page

Australian alternative rock groups
Western Australian musical groups